Neath Austral Skies is a 1913 Australian silent film directed by Raymond Longford.

It is considered a lost film.

Plot
Captain Frank Hollis (Martyn Keith) is engaged to Eileen Delmont (Lottie Lyell). When her brother Eric commits a theft, Frank accepts the blame in order to protect her family's name. He leaves for Australia and joins the New South Wales mounted police. Eric confesses and Eileen and her father go to Australia to track down Frank. They buy a property, some of their cattle is stolen and request a trooper come to their aid – it is Frank. On the way out to see them, Frank is captured by the thieves and is thrown in the river, but Eileen comes to his aid and the lovers are reunited.

Cast
Lottie Lyell as Eileen Delmont
Robert Henry as Colonel Delmont
George Parke as Eric Delmont
Martyn Keith as Captain Frank Hollis
Charles Villers as Gidgee Dan
Mervyn Barrington as Snowy, boundary rider
Walter Warr as Ah Lum, cook
T Archer as Monaro Jack

Production
Neath Austral Skies was the name of a popular collection of poetry from E.B. Loughran published in 1894.

The film was not widely screened and is not one of Longford's better known movies.

Reception
The film was shown at the Melbourne Lyric Theatre in 1913.

One contemporary critic said the film "has many exciting and sensational scenes, relieved with pure Australian comedy to hold the audience. The photography is very true." The Argus wrote about one screening being "well received."

Raymond Longford's name was used extensively in advertising.

References

External links

Neath Austral Skies at National Film and Sound Archive
Neath Austral Skies at AustLit
Complet script at National Archives of Australia

1913 films
Australian drama films
Australian silent feature films
Australian black-and-white films
Films directed by Raymond Longford
Lost Australian films
1913 drama films
1913 lost films
Lost drama films
Silent drama films